Hepler is a city in Crawford County, Kansas, United States.  As of the 2020 census, the population of the city was 90.

History
Hepler was founded in 1871. It was named for B.F. Hepler, president of the company that laid out the town.

The first post office in Hepler was established in June, 1871.

Hepler became a significant shipping point of cattle and grain on the Missouri–Kansas–Texas Railroad.

Geography
Hepler is located at  (37.661936, -94.968872).

Demographics

2010 census
As of the census of 2010, there were 132 people, 54 households, and 37 families living in the city. The racial makeup of the city was 99.2% White and 0.8% from other races. Hispanic or Latino of any race were 0.8% of the population.

There were 54 households, of which 25.9% had children under the age of 18 living with them, 59.3% were married couples living together, 1.9% had a female householder with no husband present, 7.4% had a male householder with no wife present, and 31.5% were non-families. 25.9% of all households were made up of individuals, and 11.1% had someone living alone who was 65 years of age or older. The average household size was 2.44 and the average family size was 2.97.

The median age in the city was 44.2 years. 22% of residents were under the age of 18; 6% were between the ages of 18 and 24; 25% were from 25 to 44; 31.8% were from 45 to 64; and 15.2% were 65 years of age or older. The gender makeup of the city was 52.3% male and 47.7% female.

2000 census
As of the census of 2000, there were 154 people, 59 households, and 36 families living in the city. The racial makeup of the city was 94.81% White, 0.65% African American, 3.90% Native American, and 0.65% from two or more races.

There were 59 households, out of which 37.3% had children under the age of 18 living with them, 57.6% were married couples living together, and 37.3% were non-families. 35.6% of all households were made up of individuals, and 16.9% had someone living alone who was 65 years of age or older. The average household size was 2.61 and the average family size was 3.38.

In the city, the population was spread out, with 34.4% under the age of 18, 7.1% from 18 to 24, 22.1% from 25 to 44, 16.9% from 45 to 64, and 19.5% who were 65 years of age or older. The median age was 34 years. For every 100 females, there were 105.3 males. For every 100 females age 18 and over, there were 110.4 males.

The median income for a household in the city was $26,500, and the median income for a family was $36,500. Males had a median income of $21,250 versus $22,500 for females. The per capita income for the city was $12,475. About 10.9% of families and 17.0% of the population were below the poverty line, including 26.4% of those under the age of eighteen and none of those 65 or over.

References

External links
 Hepler - Directory of Public Officials
 USD 248, local school district
 Hepler city map, KDOT

Cities in Kansas
Cities in Crawford County, Kansas